The Mayoral election of 1953 in Pittsburgh, Pennsylvania was held on Tuesday, November 3, 1953. David Lawrence of the Democratic Party won the right to serve a third term. With a broad base of support among both labor and minority voters, as well as the quiet background support of many GOP business leaders (who lauded the mayor's urban renewal projects), Lawrence coasted to an election win. His victory came over Leonard Kane, a real estate developer and the brother of the Allegheny County Treasurer.

Results

References

1953 Pennsylvania elections
1953 United States mayoral elections
1953
1950s in Pittsburgh
November 1953 events in the United States